USCGC Seneca (WMEC-906) is a United States Coast Guard medium endurance cutter. Her keel was laid on September 16, 1982 at Robert Derecktor Shipyard Incorporated, Middletown, Rhode Island. She was launched June 16, 1984 and commissioned active August 4, 1986 and formally commissioned May 9, 1987. Her namesake is the first revenue cutter  active from 1908–1936.

Seneca is the sixth of thirteen 270' Famous-class cutters designed to take the Coast Guard past the year 2000. The advanced technology used in her construction gives her the potential of being an effective Search and rescue (SAR) and Maritime Law Enforcement (MLE) platform. Advanced technology is only one way to describe Senecas primary operating computer system, SCCS (Shipboard Command and Control System). SCCS allows operators to view or act upon information from any of the ship's sensors, radar sources, or radio transceivers. Also included in SCCS is a Low Level Light TV (LLLTV) camera and an optical sight. Images from both the LLLTV and optical sight, can be displayed to any of SCCS position or the ship's entertainment system. 

The Seneca serves as a platform for Operation New Frontier; the Coast Guard's operation to employ armed helicopters and non-lethal use of force technology to stop drug laden go-fast vessels.  Seneca's actions contributed to the one hundred percent interdiction rate during Operation New Frontier, making it the most successful counter-drug operation in Coast Guard history.  Six drug smuggling go-fasts were stopped, 4,475 pounds of cocaine and 11,710 pounds of marijuana with a street value of over 125 million dollars seized, and 18 drug trafficking suspects arrested. The success of Operation New Frontier, marked a new era in Coast Guard law enforcement and maritime security efforts, and achieved a principal milestone in the Coast Guard's successful execution of the President's National Drug Control Strategy.

External links
 Seneca home page

Ships of the United States Coast Guard
Famous-class cutters
1984 ships
Ships built in Middletown, Rhode Island